Røvassdalen is a valley in the municipality of Rana in Nordland county, Norway. The upper part of the valley is located within the Saltfjellet–Svartisen National Park. The river of Røvassåga flows through the valley, and later it joins with the rivers Blakkåga and Svartisåga and further down with the Langvassåga. The karst caves Setergrotta and Grønligrotta are located in the valley.

References

Valleys of Nordland
Rana, Norway